"Stand and Sing of Zambia, Proud and Free" is the national anthem of Zambia. The tune is taken from the hymn "Nkosi Sikelel' iAfrika", which was composed by Xhosa composer Enoch Sontonga, in 1897. The lyrics were composed after Zambian independence to specifically reflect Zambia, as opposed to Sontonga's lyrics, which refer to Africa as a whole.

History 
"Nkosi Sikelel' iAfrika" started to become popular in South Africa in 1923 as a Christian hymn. It became a closing hymn for African National Congress (ANC) meetings and later became a symbolic song for black struggle against the Apartheid regime. Its popularity spread across Africa through churches, and the tune became associated with African nationalism movements across the continent, particularly in East and Southern Africa. Following the passing of the Zambia Independence Act 1964 in the Parliament of the United Kingdom, enacting Zambia's independence from the United Kingdom, "Nkosi Sikelel' iAfrika" was adopted as the national anthem of Zambia, replacing "God Save the Queen", the anthem of Northern Rhodesia. In 1973, having used "Nkosi Sikeleli Africa" for over 9 years, it was decided that new lyrics set to the tune of "Nkosi Sikelel' iAfrika" would be needed for Zambia's national anthem. A national competition was held for the new words. However, none of the entries were deemed good enough to be used in full for the anthem. As a result, six of the entries were merged to create "Stand and Sing of Zambia, Proud and Free", and the entrants selected were awarded prizes. The authors credited for the composition were G. Ellis, E.S. Musonda, J.M.S. Lichilana, I. Lowe, J. Sajiwandani and R.J. Seal.

In September 1973, the National Assembly passed the National Anthem Act, which legally defined the English lyrics of "Stand and Sing of Zambia, Proud and Free" as the national anthem of Zambia. The Act also made it an offence to "insult or bring into contempt or ridicule" the anthem and granted the President of Zambia the rights to prescribe how the anthem is sung and to restrict its use.

Lyrics 
On occasions requiring brevity, usually the first verse and chorus are sung.

Criticism
In 2005, Zambian women's groups petitioned for a number of the lyrics in "Stand and Sing of Zambia, Proud and Free" to be changed, because they felt that they were too male orientated. In response, it was decreed that the current lyrics did include women in context, and it was stated that "Stand and Sing of Zambia, Proud and Free" was "composed of historical lyrics that reflect the country's heritage."

In 2012, Professor Michelo Hansungule repeated the concerns that the Zambian national anthem was too masculine. He also argued that because it had the same tune as the national anthem of South Africa, it might have intellectual property implications and suggested that Zambia's sovereignty could be questioned.

See also

National anthem of South Africa

References 

3. https://www.parliament.gov.zm/sites/default/files/documents/acts/National%20Anthem%20Act.pdf

External links
Zambia: "Stand and Sing of Zambia, Proud and Free" - Audio of the national anthem of Zambia, with information and lyrics

National anthems
National symbols of Zambia
African anthems
Zambian songs
National anthem compositions in G major